Kiyonomori Masao (8 April 1935 – 20 April 2019, real name Masao Sasaki) was a sumo wrestler from Ōmori, Akita, Japan. He made his professional debut in January 1953 and reached the top division in March 1959. His highest rank was maegashira 9. Upon retirement from active competition he became an elder in the Japan Sumo Association and took charge of Kise stable from his father-in-law Katsuragawa. He reached the Sumo Association's mandatory retirement age in April 2000. He died of pneumonia in April 2019 at the age of 84.

Career record
The Kyushu tournament was first held in 1957, and the Nagoya tournament in 1958.

See also
Glossary of sumo terms
List of past sumo wrestlers
List of sumo tournament second division champions

References

1935 births
2019 deaths
Japanese sumo wrestlers
Sumo people from Akita Prefecture